The Tax Law Rewrite Project of HM Revenue and Customs was a major effort to re-write the entire tax legislation of the United Kingdom in a format which is both more consistent and more understandable. It aimed to remove archaic language and impenetrable terminology from tax law and to replace it with modern language and terminology.

History 
The project was set up in 1996 and produced five pieces of primary legislation and one piece of secondary legislation. A sixth and seventh bill went before Parliament. The project focussed purely on primary legislation but special dispensation was given to the re-writing of the regulations governing PAYE by the project.

The project began its work with the legislation covering capital allowances and the first legislation passed thanks to the project was the Capital Allowances Act 2001. The project then moved on to consider income tax. Three pieces of primary legislation relating to income tax—the Income Tax (Earnings and Pensions) Act 2003, the Income Tax (Trading and Other Income) Act 2005 and the Income Tax Act 2007—have been passed by Parliament. Their main change is to remove the concept of schedules from British income tax law. Previously income was assessed in one of six schedules (labelled from A through to F) depending on its source. The schedules have been replaced with everyday terminology. For example, Schedule A income is now referred to as property income and Schedule E income is now referred to as employment income.

It was felt that in addition to the primary legislation necessary for the project that one piece of secondary legislation would need to be rewritten. The PAYE system is intimately linked with income tax in British law and consequently the legislation governing it was dealt with by the project. The result was the Income Tax (PAYE) Regulations 2003.

Following the passage of the Income Tax Act 2007 attention was turned to corporation tax. The Corporation Tax Act 2009 applies to accounting periods ending on or after 1 April 2009. Two further bills were enacted in 2010 – the Corporation Tax Act 2010 and the Taxation (International and Other Provisions) Act 2010. Once these bills were enacted the Tax Law Rewrite Project was disbanded in April 2010 – see ICAEW report.

The legislation was scrutinized by the Joint Committee on Tax Law Rewrite Bills.

References

External links 
Tax Law Rewrite Project: HM Revenue and Customs

Taxation in the United Kingdom
Law of the United Kingdom
1997 establishments in the United Kingdom
Tax law
Law reform in the United Kingdom